Ali Ashfaq is the top goalscorer of all time for the Maldives national football team, with 57 goals in 90 appearances since his debut in 2003.

On 3 December 2003, Ashfaq scored his debut goal, yet his first hat-trick for Maldives against Mongolia in 2006 FIFA World Cup qualifier. In September 2013, Ashfaq netted six times against Sri Lanka in 2013 SAFF Championship. With scoring double hat-trick in a single game, he became the only player for Maldives to score a double hat-trick of all time. In the same tournament, he netted four goals against Bhutan and became the all-time top scorer of SAFF Championship with 23 goals, surpassing the record previously held by India's Bhaichung Bhutia.

Goals
Scores and results list Maldives' goal tally first.

Statistics

References

Ashfaq, Ali
Maldives national football team